Víctor Villaseñor (23 December 1903 – 9 December 1981) was a Mexican sprinter. He competed in the men's 400 metres at the 1928 Summer Olympics.

References

1903 births
1981 deaths
Athletes (track and field) at the 1928 Summer Olympics
Mexican male sprinters
Olympic athletes of Mexico
Place of birth missing
20th-century Mexican people